Bdin may refer to:
 Vidin, historically known as Bdin, a city in Bulgaria
 OFC Bdin Vidin, a Bulgarian football club
 Bdín, a village in the Czech Republic